Status quo ante may refer to:
 Status quo ante (phrase), Latin for "the way things were before"
 Status Quo Ante (Hungary), Jewish communities in Hungary

See also 
 Status quo ante bellum, Latin for "the way things were before the war"
 Status Quo Ante Synagogue (disambiguation)

Latin words and phrases